"You're Makin' Me High" is the lead single from American singer Toni Braxton's second studio album, Secrets (1996). The mid-tempo song represents a joint collaboration between the Grammy Award-winning producer Babyface and Bryce Wilson. The beat of the song was originally for singer-songwriter Brandy, with Dallas Austin pegged to write a lyric to override; however, Braxton had Babyface write lyrics for the song. It was ultimately issued in the United States as a double A-side with "Let It Flow", the airplay hit from the 1995 film Waiting to Exhale. 

"You're Makin' Me High" became Braxton's first number-one single on both the US Billboard Hot 100 and Hot R&B/Hip-Hop Songs charts; it remained on top for one week on the former and for two weeks on the latter, eventually going Platinum. A remix by David Morales with re-recorded vocals allowed the single to also top the Dance Club Songs chart for two weeks in August 1996. Another remix for urban markets was created featuring rapper Foxy Brown, called the "Groove Mix". A dancehall mix was also recorded featuring Jamaican dancehall DJ Mad Cobra.

The song earned Braxton her third Grammy Award for Best Female R&B Vocal Performance in 1997. The success of "You're Makin' Me High" would later be continued with the release of "Un-Break My Heart". "You're Makin' Me High" was sampled for Method Man & Redman's 2001 song "Part II", from the How High soundtrack. In 2014, Anglo-American producer/DJ Secondcity sampled a part of the song's bridge for the main hook of his UK number-one single "I Wanna Feel".

Critical reception
Larry Flick from Billboard described the song a "sleek'n'sexy slice o' jeep funk" with a "sophisticated toned and rich production", as well as praising the song's chorus. Peter Miro from Cash Box remarked that Braxton "oozes sensuality with her phrasing on “You’re Makin’ Me High”, mated to tight, cascading backup harmonies, and a crossover-capable baseline. She projects allure sufficient enough to perpetuate her sultry, waif-like mystique." Alan Jones from Music Week declared it as "a nagging and surprisingly sprightly R&B workout", with the singer's "exceptional" vocals and deemed it "an obvious hit". Damien Mendis from the RM Dance Update gave the song five out of five, writing, "Oh my gosh! The ever-reliable Babyface hooks up with Bryce Wilson of Groove Theory to create a definitive true R&B flave that'll leave you begging for more. Check the recipe: phat 'Tell Me'-style beats, Intro/Edie Brickell-ish guitar licks entwined with subtle bass and a floating eastern-sounding moog hook. Toni's effortlessly smooth vocal is textured beautifully with lushly layered backing harmonies. Delicious!" In an retrospective review, Pop Rescue complimented it as a "wonderful mid-tempo song, making the most of the sultry vocals, slinky bass and beats." The reviewer also added that the backing vocals "sound great – adding an extra layer of warmth." Richard Harrington from The Washington Post stated that Braxton "can handle airy, upbeat material", like "You're Makin' Me High". He explained, "With its sinewy synth-line, it has more of a West Coast sound than most LaFace productions, but the impression is more joyful than ominous. A celebration of sexual desire, it also includes a bit of erotic breathing and a coy masturbation reference".

Music video

The accompanying music video for "You're Makin' Me High", directed by Bille Woodruff, features Braxton and a group of friends (consisting of actresses Erika Alexander, Vivica A. Fox, and Tisha Campbell-Martin) enjoying themselves in luxurious surroundings. An elevator brings up a series of men, some very attractive and others amusingly unattractive. Braxton and her friends "judge" the men using oversized playing cards as score cards. Periodically, one of the women chooses a man to leave with. Braxton chooses Bryce Wilson, whom she dated at the time, and they are shown together in a bathtub of cotton candy and on a dance floor, with Braxton also shown wearing a white bodysuit. The music video premiered on MTV, BET, and VH1 on the week ending May 5, 1996.

Track listings

United States

 CD single
 "You're Makin' Me High" (album version) – 4:27
 "Let It Flow" (album version) – 4:21

 Maxi-CD single
 "You're Makin' Me High" (album version) – 4:27
 "You're Makin' Me High" (classic mix) – 9:41
 "You're Makin' Me High" (dance hall mix) – 4:51
 "You're Makin' Me High" (groove remix) – 4:32
 "Let It Flow" – 4:21

 12-inch single
A1. "You're Makin' Me High" (classic mix) – 9:41
A2. "You're Makin' Me High" (classic dub) – 6:12
B1. "You're Makin' Me High" (groove remix) – 4:32
B2. "You're Makin' Me High" (dance hall mix) – 4:51
B3. "You're Makin' Me High" (album version) – 4:27
B4. "Let It Flow" – 4:21

 7-inch single
A. "You're Makin' Me High" – 4:07
B. "Let It Flow" – 4:21

 Cassette single
A1. "You're Makin' Me High" (radio edit) – 4:07
A2. "Let It Flow" (album version) – 4:22
B1. "You're Makin' Me High" (instrumental) – 4:07
B2. "Let It Flow" (instrumental) – 4:22

 Maxi-cassette single
A1. "You're Makin' Me High" (classic mix) – 9:41
A2. "You're Makin' Me High" (groove remix) – 4:32
A3. "Let It Flow" – 4:21
B1. "You're Makin' Me High" (dance hall mix) – 4:51
B2. "You're Makin' Me High" (album version) – 4:27

International

 UK CD1
 "You're Makin' Me High" (radio edit)
 "You're Makin' Me High" (T'empo's radio edit)
 "You're Makin' Me High" (dancehall mix)
 "You're Makin' Me High" (groove remix)
 "You're Makin' Me High" (T'empo's private club mix)
 "You're Makin' Me High" (classic mix—Morales)

 UK CD2
 "You're Makin' Me High" (radio edit)
 "Let It Flow"
 "Breathe Again"
 "Another Sad Love Song"

 UK cassette single
 "You're Makin' Me High" (radio edit)
 "Let It Flow"

 European CD single
 "You're Makin' Me High" (album version/radio edit) – 4:07
 "You're Makin' Me High" (classic edit) – 3:35

 Australian and Japanese CD single
 "You're Makin' Me High" (album version/radio edit) – 4:07
 "You're Makin' Me High" (album version) – 4:26
 "You're Makin' Me High" (classic edit) – 3:35
 "You're Makin' Me High" (classic mix) – 9:41

Personnel and credits
Credits are adapted from the Secrets liner notes.

 Toni Braxton: lead vocals, background vocals
 Kenneth "Babyface" Edmonds: writer, producer, keyboards, guitar, background vocals
 Bryce Wilson: writer, producer, keyboards, programming
 Chante Moore, Marc Nelson, Jakkai Butler: background vocals
 Brad Gilderman, Russell Elevado: recording
 Bassy Bob Brockman: mixing
 Paul Boutin, Robbes Stieglietz, Bryan Reminic: assistant engineers
 Randy Walker: midi programming

Charts

Weekly charts

Year-end charts

Decade-end charts

Certifications

Release history

See also
 R&B number-one hits of 1996 (USA)
 Hot 100 number-one hits of 1996 (United States)
 Number-one dance hits of 1996 (USA)

References

1996 singles
1996 songs
Arista Records singles
Billboard Hot 100 number-one singles
LaFace Records singles
Music videos directed by Bille Woodruff
Song recordings produced by Babyface (musician)
Songs written by Babyface (musician)
Songs written by Bryce Wilson
Toni Braxton songs